Pietro Gandolfi (born April 21, 1987 in Parma) is an Italian racing driver.

Career

Formula Renault
Gandolfi began his racing career at the age of thirteen, competing in kart racing for four years. In 2004 he became a racing instructor at the Henry Morrogh Motor School in Perugia, driving a Formula Renault 1600 car for the first time as well at around this time.

In 2006, Gandolfi competed in five races of the Italian Formula Renault Championship. The following year he moved to the equivalent Swiss series, taking 21st position in the championship. He remained in the category for 2007, but slipped to 26th overall.

Formula Two
Gandolfi signed to drive for the relaunched FIA Formula Two Championship in 2009. He drove car number nine in the series, and finished 27th with no points. He has not raced since.

Racing record

Career summary

Complete FIA Formula Two Championship results
(key) (Races in bold indicate pole position) (Races in italics indicate fastest lap)

References

External links
Official website 
Pietro Gandolfi career details at driverdb.com

1987 births
Living people
Italian racing drivers
Italian Formula Renault 2.0 drivers
Formula Renault 2.0 Alps drivers
FIA Formula Two Championship drivers
BVM Racing drivers